Denmark was represented by Hot Eyes (the name chosen for use at Eurovision by Kirsten & Søren), with the song "Sku' du spørg' fra no'en?", at the 1985 Eurovision Song Contest, which took place on 4 May in Gothenburg, Sweden. "Sku' du spørg' fra no'en?" was chosen as the Danish entry at the Dansk Melodi Grand Prix on 9 March. This was the second consecutive Eurovision appearance for Kirsten & Søren.

Before Eurovision

Dansk Melodi Grand Prix 1985 
The DMGP was held at the DR TV studios in Copenhagen, hosted by Jørgen Mylius. Ten songs took part with the winner being decided by voting from five regional juries. Other participants included DMGP institution Tommy Seebach, 1983 Danish representative Gry Johansen, and Lise Haavik (Trax) who would represent Denmark in 1986.

At Eurovision 
On the night of the final Hot Eyes performed 4th in the running order, following Cyprus and preceding Spain. The song featured vocal interjections from Søren's 9-year-old daughter, who scampered about the stage while removing clothing accessories from the backing singers and putting them on herself. Although very similar in style to the previous year's "Det' lige det", "Sku' du spørg' fra no'en?" was less successful and at the close of voting had received 41 points, placing Denmark 11th of the 19 entries. The Danish jury awarded its 12 points to contest winners Norway.

Voting

References 

1985
Countries in the Eurovision Song Contest 1985
Eurovision